Leonila "Inday" de la Serna Dimataga Garcia (July 17, 1906 – May 17, 1994) was a Filipino pharmacist who was the eighth First Lady of the Philippines. She was the wife of Philippine President Carlos P. Garcia. She assumed the title on March 18, 1957 upon the accession of her husband, who was then-Vice President, shortly after the death of President Ramon Magsaysay.

Fondly called "Inday", the native of Opon (now Lapu-Lapu City), Cebu was a pharmacist graduate of the University of Santo Tomas. She met her future husband Carlos while working at a drug store in Tagbilaran, Bohol that he had frequented. They married on May 24, 1933 and had a daughter together, Linda Garcia-Campos.

As First Lady, Garcia became active in cultural and social activities in line with her husband's Filipino First Policy. 

She vied for a Senate seat in 1971, but lost.

References

1906 births
1994 deaths
Filipino pharmacists
Filipino Roman Catholics
People from Bohol
People from Lapu-Lapu City
Nacionalista Party politicians
University of Santo Tomas alumni
First Ladies and First Gentlemen of the Philippines
Spouses of presidents of the Philippines
Women pharmacists